The 2003 Utah snowstorm was a major snowstorm that affected the state of Utah during December 25–31, 2003. The Wasatch Front from the Salt Lake Valley northward saw generally 1–3 feet of snow (30–90 cm), with up to four feet on the benches, while the surrounding mountains generally saw 5–7 feet of snow (1.5–2 m), with up to nine feet in some areas. The storm even reached southern Utah with moderate snow amounts, with a few inches in some low-lying valley locations. At least five deaths were attributed to the heavy snow.

The Salt Lake City airport saw  of snow. The  of snow that fell during December 25–28, in the first wave of the storm, ranks as the 5th-largest storm in Salt Lake City history. The most snow along the Wasatch Front was found on the Layton bench in Davis County, which saw . Davis and Weber Counties were perhaps the hardest-hit areas, with even valley locations recording over 2 and as much as 3 feet (60–90 cm) in places. Bountiful, typically one of the areas hardest hit by lake-effect snows, saw , Clearfield , and Ogden . Areas along the southern Wasatch Front saw less snow, with just  in Provo, although Spanish Fork saw , due to lake effect snows from Utah Lake, which Spanish Fork is frequently in the path of.

The Wasatch Mountains saw phenomenal, near-record amounts of snow. The ski resorts of Salt Lake County saw several feet of snow as well, with some skiers reporting "epic ski conditions." Alta saw  of snow, Snowbird had , Brighton , and Nordic Valley .

Unusual for such a storm, this massive snowstorm even penetrated into southern Utah, dropping moderate amounts across the south.

Overall, five people were killed in the storm. An avalanche on the east side of Mount Timpanogos killed three snowboarders on December 26, while traffic accidents killed two people on December 28. In addition, at least 1,000,000 people along the Wasatch Front lost power just on the first day of the storm, and at least 2,000 traffic accidents were reported (most of them along the Wasatch Front). In total, the storm caused at least $3,820,000 in damage. Utah Power (now Rocky Mountain Power) faced criticism from residents and even the Salt Lake City council on the speed and effectiveness of restoring power to the area after more than 300 customers were still without power 20 days after the storm.

References

External links
Deseret News article
NWS report

Utah Snowstorm, 2003
Natural disasters in Utah
Snowstorm
2003 natural disasters in the United States